Hyesan Ch'ŏngnyŏn station is the central railway station of Hyesan city, located in the Ch'un-dong neighbourhood of greater Hyesan city, Ryanggang province, North Korea. A large station with seven tracks, it is the junction point of the Korean State Railway's Paektusan Ch'ŏngnyŏn and Pukbunaeryuk lines.

History
Originally called Hyesan station (Chosŏn'gŭl: 혜산역; Hanja: 恵山駅), the station, along with the rest of the Pongdu-ri-Hyesanjin section of the Kilhye Line, was opened by the Chosen Government Railway on 1 November 1937. It received its current name sometime after the 1970s.

In 1997 there was an accident at the station involving the collision of two trains.

Services
Hyesan is a significant point for the movement of freight to and from various points in Ryanggang Province. There is also significant passenger traffic to and from Hyesan; in addition to various local trains on both the Paektusan Ch'ŏngnyŏn and Pukpu lines, there are express trains (1/2) to P'yŏngyang and (3/4) to West P'yŏngyang via Kilju, as well as semi-express trains between Hyesan and Kilju (101/102) and between Hyesan and Haeju via Kilju (104-107/108-111)

References

Railway stations in North Korea
Railway stations opened in 1937